Muslim women in sciences and technology, since the Islamic Golden Age, Muslims have been actively participating in various sciences. Muslim women have come a long way; from not being allowed to work outside of being housewives all the way to becoming top achievers. There have and still are many misconceptions about Muslim women, such as that they need to be covered, they are not well-respected, or that they belong in the kitchen. Besides being a Muslim woman and that challenges that come with it, many of them had big parts in science and technology evolvements. These are the women who stepped up in their home countries, who have strict laws in general and became something of themselves.

Islam and science 
Thousands of years ago, Muslims had a huge part with the advancement of science Almost the majority of misconceptions were all just misconceptions. Islam encourages that men and women are equal. The Islamic Holy Book, The Quran, instructs that Muslims should not just educate their sons, but as well at their daughters. Islamic history also involves very important women political leaders, who were all known for what they did. However, this does not mean that Muslim countries did not restrict women from advancing in their studies. Many Muslim countries were, and still are big on gender-based discrimination, because they believe it is a part of Islam, which is completely false. Proof of this could be the 750 verses from the Quran which state, "the quest for knowledge and science is obligatory upon every Muslim man and woman".

Anousheh Ansari 

Anousheh Ansari on September 18, 2006, a 40 year old woman, was the first female private space explorer. She was launched off from Kazakhstan in a Russian Soyuz spacecraft She migrated from Iran to America when she was about 17, in 1984. In 1993, her husband, Hamid Ansari and brother in law, Amir Ansari worked together and funded a company called Telecom Technologies Inc. Ansari received her bachelor's in computer and electrons engineering from George Mason University, Fairfax, Virginia. Soon after, she completed her masters in Washington D.C at George Washington University. Anousheh spoke several different languages, such as Persian, French, English, and Russian - which she learned for her spaceflight.

Hayat Al Sindi 

Hayat Al Sindi is a medical scientist in Saudi Arabia. She is also the first female among the Consultative Assembly of Saudi Arabia's members. Her contributions were extremely good for biotechnology as well as medical testing. "My mission is to find simple, inexpensive ways to monitor health that are specifically designed for remote places and harsh conditions" Her test devices made sure to not require external power, electricity, etc. Sindi never spoke English or even traveled outside of Saudi Arabia,  but she ended up moving to England to join a university. After learning English on her, she applied to Cambridge University for biotechnology and was the first female to be accepted into it. Sindi has since then shown a powerful message to other women and children. And let women know that they can transform societies if they wanted to.

Science and technology
International Forum on Women in Science and Technology in Muslim Countries was held by the United Nations, regarding the changes women have brought in the sciences in Muslim countries.

See also
Women in Islam

References

Islam and women
Islam and science
Women and science